Bank Windhoek Limited, commonly referred to as Bank Windhoek, is a registered commercial bank in Namibia, which is licensed by the Bank of Namibia (BoN) to operate in the country. It provides financial services to its clients in Namibia which include personal, Small and Medium-sized Enterprises (SMEs), commercial accounts and financial products.

Bank Windhoek also offers foreign exchange services throughout its branches and through a joint venture with American Express, which has various outlets in Namibia. While being an autonomous Namibian company, the bank also provides international banking services through direct liaison with financial centres and institutions worldwide.

Branch network and localised ATMs 
Bank Windhoek has the largest branch network and footprint across Namibia. As of June 2022, it has 51 branches, agencies and specialist branches countrywide. The bank also has a corporate and institutional banking division with offices in Windhoek, Oshakati and Walvis Bay.

The bank also has 149 ATMs across Namibia and 253 Bank Windhoek Cash Express ATMs installed at various merchant locations countrywide in partnership with ATM Solutions Namibia.

Bank Windhoek is also the only bank in Namibia to offer ATM's with local language options.

Ownership structure
Bank Windhoek, a fully owned subsidiary of the Capricorn Group, is the largest entity under the umbrella of Capricorn Investment Group Limited, branded as "Capricorn Group", a Namibian financial services group listed on the Namibian Stock Exchange, with interests in banking, insurance, asset management, investments and microfinance.

Until May 2017, Capricorn Group was a subsidiary of Capricorn Investment Holdings Limited (CIH). At present, the two largest shareholders of Capricorn Group are Capricorn Investment Holdings (CIH), which holds a 41% shareholding in Capricorn Group and the Government Institutions Pension Fund, which holds 25.9%.

Bank Windhoek contributes more than 95% of the total income of Capricorn Group and represents more than 89% of the group's net asset value. While BW Finance, a subsidiary of Bank Windhoek, is the vehicle through which the group does its micro lending business, which is a separate entity, as per regulation.

Directors

See also
 Economy of Namibia
 Bank Gaborone
 List of banks in Namibia

References

Banks of Namibia
Banks established in 1982
1982 establishments in South West Africa